Protoplasm is the third EP by Black Rain, released on October 6, 2013 by Blackest Ever Black.

Reception
The Fader  called Protoplasms title track "grossly cinematic" and "six minutes of synthetic gloom, crunching and clamoring through a dense, beat-heavy atmosphere."

 Track listing 

 Personnel 
Adapted from the Protoplasm liner notes.Black Rain Stuart Argabright – instruments, productionProduction and design'
 Matt Colton – mastering
 Oliver Smith – design

Release history

References

External links 
 
 
 Protoplasm at Bandcamp
 Protoplasm at iTunes

2013 EPs
Black Rain (band) albums